Kamel Chater (born 7 April 1972) is a welterweight boxer from Tunisia, who twice won the gold medal at the All-Africa Games in his weight division. He is a two-time Olympian (1996 and 2000).

References
sports-reference

1972 births
Living people
Welterweight boxers
Boxers at the 1996 Summer Olympics
Boxers at the 2000 Summer Olympics
Olympic boxers of Tunisia
Tunisian male boxers
African Games gold medalists for Tunisia
African Games medalists in boxing
Mediterranean Games bronze medalists for Tunisia
Mediterranean Games medalists in boxing
Competitors at the 1995 All-Africa Games
Competitors at the 1999 All-Africa Games
Competitors at the 1997 Mediterranean Games
21st-century Tunisian people
20th-century Tunisian people